The Loosveldt Bridge is located bear Rushville, Nebraska, and is also known as the Budd Bridge, the Niobrara River Bridge, and NEHBS No. SH00-43. It was built in 1888. It was built by the King Iron Bridge & Manufacturing Co. and George E. King Bridge Co. and is a Baltimore through truss.

It was listed on the National Register of Historic Places in 1992.

Like the nearby Colclesser Bridge, it was built in 1933 from one of multiple spans of the Columbus Loup River Bridge (which was built in 1888, and which had been disassembled and replaced early in 1933).  It was used as a county road bridge until 1984, when it was sold to a private rancher.

References

Road bridges on the National Register of Historic Places in Nebraska
Bridges completed in 1888
Buildings and structures in Sheridan County, Nebraska
National Register of Historic Places in Sheridan County, Nebraska
Truss bridges in the United States